Helen Joan Anderson  (born 11 September 1955) is a New Zealand professional director, scientist and, previously, public servant. She currently serves as a director on a number of boards.

Early life and family 
Anderson was born in Dunedin on 11 September 1955, the daughter of Patricia and Atherton Anderson.

Anderson was educated at Columba College, and then studied at the University of Auckland, graduating with a BSc(Hons). She later undertook doctoral studies at the University of Cambridge, gaining a PhD in 1985.

Professional career 
Anderson is currently, or has previously been, Chair of the Board of BRANZ, Studio Pacific Architecture, Scion and Fulbright NZ, a director at Antarctica New Zealand, NIWA, Dairy NZ and ClearPoint Ltd. Other roles held have been on the councils of Massey University (as Pro-Chancellor), the Institute of Directors New Zealand and Nature Conservancy Aotearoa NZ.

Anderson is a seismologist with expertise in the mechanics of large earthquakes.

From 1997 to 2003 she was the Chief Science Advisor at the Ministry of Research, Science and Technology. She was then the Chief Executive of the Ministry from 2003 to April 2010.

Honours
In 1993, Anderson was awarded the New Zealand Suffrage Centennial Medal. She was appointed a Companion of the Queen's Service Order in the 2010 Queen's Birthday Honours, for services to the Ministry of Science, Research and Technology. Anderson is a Companion of the Royal Society of New Zealand (CRSNZ),and Patron of Wing 297 NZ Police Recruits and the NZ International Science Festival.

References 

20th-century New Zealand women scientists
New Zealand public servants
Living people
New Zealand seismologists
Alumni of the University of Cambridge
Companions of the Queen's Service Order
20th-century New Zealand geologists
Recipients of the New Zealand Suffrage Centennial Medal 1993
Companions of the Royal Society of New Zealand
Scientists from Dunedin
People educated at Columba College
1955 births
University of Auckland alumni
21st-century New Zealand geologists